The Travis County Republican Party is the organization governing the Republican Party in Travis County, Texas.

Organization and governance 

The Travis County Republican Party is one of the 254 county affiliates of the Republican Party of Texas.  The county party organization is governed by the bylaws of the Travis County Republican Executive Committee, which is composed of elected or appointed precinct chairmen from any of the county's 247 voting precincts. Its members are selected in the Republican Primary election once every two years, coinciding with the election of the County Chairman. Precinct Chairmen may be appointed by the Executive Committee in between elections to fulfill unexpired terms in vacant precincts. The County Chairman is responsible for calling the party to order following each primary election cycle and overseeing the administrative duties of the county party, along with several statutory duties given by state code to party chairmen.

History 

The Travis County Republican Party has origins dating to shortly before the U.S. Civil War. The newly formed national Republican Party favored the abolition of slavery among other goals.

Following the conclusion of the Civil War, on July 4, 1867, the Republican Party of Texas was formally organized in the city of Austin, Texas in Travis County. The Republican Party of Travis County therefore had an influential role in the process of re-aligning Texas with the Union. Records from this period are difficult to come by and the county party's early history is obscure. John L. Haynes of Travis County was chairman of the State Executive Committee in 1868.

While the war-wounds were still fresh during the Reconstruction Era, Democrats loyal to the South rose as the dominant political force in not only Travis County but most everywhere else in Texas and throughout the South. The first Republican statewide primary would not be held until 1926 with a meager 15,239 voters participating. Only two more primaries would be attempted in the next thirty-four years. Republicans only won sporadic offices in the decades to follow, and did not become more prominent in Texas politics until the latter part of the 20th Century.

By the mid-1990s many counties began to "flip" from Southern Democrat to Republican, and by the end of the decade all statewide seats were held by the Texas GOP with a majority of counties solidly Republican. Large cities such as Austin, the seat of Travis County, continued to stay majority Democratic. As such, the Travis GOP remains the smaller of the two major parties in the Austin metro area.

Notes

References

External links 
 Travis County Republican Party
 Republican Party of Texas

Political parties in Texas
Travis County, Texas